Willie James Slater is an American football coach and college athletics administrator. He is the head football coach at Clark Atlanta University, a position he has held since February 2022. Slater served as the head football coach at Tuskegee University in Tuskegee, Alabama, from 2006 to 2021. His teams won the Pioneer Bowl in 2006, 2007, and 2009. In 2007, his undefeated squad was named the black small college football national champions and claimed outright or has shared that crown more times. Slater was appointed as athletic director at Tuskegee in 2017. In December 2021, Tuskegee hired Reginald Ruffin from Miles College to succeed Slater as head football coach and athletic director.

Head coaching record

College

References

External links
 Clark Atlanta profile
 Tuskegee profile

Year of birth missing (living people)
Living people
American football quarterbacks
Clark Atlanta Panthers football coaches
Jacksonville State Gamecocks football coaches
North Alabama Lions football coaches
Temple Owls football coaches
Troy Trojans football coaches
Tuskegee Golden Tigers athletic directors
Tuskegee Golden Tigers football coaches
West Alabama Tigers football coaches
West Alabama Tigers football players
High school football coaches in Alabama
People from Clarke County, Alabama
African-American coaches of American football
African-American players of American football
20th-century African-American sportspeople
21st-century African-American sportspeople